Alessandro Ghinelli (born 1 August 1951, in Pistoia) is an Italian politician.

Former member of right-wing party National Alliance, he ran for Mayor of Arezzo as an independent at the 2015 Italian local elections, supported by a centre-right coalition formed by Lega Nord, Forza Italia, Brothers of Italy and the civic list "Ora Ghinelli". He was elected Mayor of Arezzo and took office on 16 June 2015.

See also
2015 Italian local elections
List of mayors of Arezzo

References

External links
 
 

1952 births
Living people
Mayors of Arezzo
21st-century Italian politicians
University of Florence alumni
People from Pistoia